WR-40 Langusta is a Polish self-propelled multiple rocket launcher developed by Centrum Produkcji Wojskowej HSW SA. The first 32 units of the WR-40 entered service in 2010.

The Langusta (spiny lobster) is based on a deeply modernized and re-worked Soviet cold-war era BM-21 launcher. Old petrol Ural-375D truck chassis was replaced with a modern one, and the launcher was fitted with a fire control system. The carrier used is Polish 6x6 Jelcz truck model P662D.35 with low-profile armoured cabin for a whole crew. Also new ammunition Feniks-Z with 42 km range was adopted.

The prototype was made in 2006 and given to the Army in 2007, after successful trials. A series modernization of 75 vehicles followed.

Another step in the modernization of Polish rocket artillery is project 'Homar', corresponding to HIMARS rocket system, carried on from 2007.

See also
 BM-21 Grad
 RS-122
 RM-70 multiple rocket launcher

References

Wheeled self-propelled rocket launchers
Self-propelled artillery of Poland
Multiple rocket launchers
Military vehicles introduced in the 2010s